Drymocallis is a genus of plants formerly (and sometimes still) included with the typical cinquefoils (Potentilla). It contains three species known or suspected to be protocarnivorous, but more cinquefoils might eventually be moved here:

Drymocallis arguta (Pursh) Rydb. – tall cinquefoil, cream cinquefoil
Drymocallis glandulosa (Lindl.) Rydb. – sticky cinquefoil
Drymocallis rupestris (L.) Soják – rock cinquefoil

DNA sequence data suggests they are more closely related to Chamaerhodos and Dasiphora than to species such as Potentilla reptans (creeping cinquefoil) which make up the bulk of Potentilla.

References

External links

 
Rosaceae genera